Santiago Morales (born 20 November 1951) is a Spanish wrestler. He competed in the men's freestyle 100 kg at the 1980 Summer Olympics.

References

External links
 

1951 births
Living people
Spanish male sport wrestlers
Olympic wrestlers of Spain
Wrestlers at the 1980 Summer Olympics
Place of birth missing (living people)
20th-century Spanish people
21st-century Spanish people